Peter Schlatter (born 1 February 1968) is a German judoka.

Achievements

External links
 

1968 births
Living people
German male judoka
20th-century German people
21st-century German people